Again (stylized as again) is the fourth extended play by Japanese recording artist Ayumi Hamasaki from her fourteenth studio album Love Again (2013). The EP contains the songs "Wake Me Up", "Sweet Scar", "Snowy Kiss" and "Ivy", alongside remixes and instrumental versions of the original tracks. Produced by longtime collaborator Max Matsuura, Again is a pop EP.

Again was released as the second part of Hamasaki's fifteenth anniversary celebration on December 8, 2012 by Avex Trax. It received mixed reviews from music critics; some critics commended the songs "safe" composition while some criticized the production and delivery. Charted as a single on the Japanese Oricon Singles Chart, it reached number seven. All tracks from Again received an accompanying music video and was included on the DVD version.

Background and release
In September 2012, Hamasaki and her label Avex Trax confirmed that they would release five new music releases from November 2012 until March 2013 to commemorate Hamasaki's fifteenth year in music business on April 8, 2013. Avex confirmed the releases of two extended plays; Love (November 2012) and Again (December 2012), and announced plans to release the compilation album A Classical and a live DVD Arena Tour 2012: Hotel Love Songs. Love was released first, reaching number four on the Japanese Oricon Singles Chart and was certified gold by the Recording Industry Association of Japan (RIAJ) for exceeding shipments of 100,000 units. Hamasaki announced plans on releasing a new studio album, and revealed that the recordings from both EPs would be included on the album. Again contains four original tracks: "Wake Me Up", "Sweet Scar", "Snowy Kiss" and "Ivy". Again was released on December 8, 2012, through Avex Trax on two formats: a stand-alone CD and a CD and DVD package. The music videos to "Wake Me Up", "Sweet Scar" and "Snowy Kiss" were featured on the DVD version of the EP.

Composition
All lyrics to Again were written by Hamasaki herself, while the album was produced by long-time collaborator Max Matsuura. The album opener, "Wake Me Up", is a "glossy 1980s" electronic rock song that was compared to the work of British group Duran Duran. The second track "Sweet Scar" is a pop ballad that features violin sections, piano riffs and woodwind instruments, which was noted as a musical departure from her signature "big orchestrated strings and stadium drums". The third track "Snowy Kiss" is an uptempo dance-pop song that lasts six minutes long, and "Ivy" has Hamasaki singing in higher octaves with a slower tempo. Again features an acoustic remix of "Missing" and "Melody" that appeared on Love, one remix each for "Wake Me Up" and "Snowy Kiss" and the original instrumentals.

Reception
The songs from Again received mixed reviews. Random J from Asian Junkie reviewed "Sweet Scar" and "Wake Me Up" individually. For "Sweet Scar", he commented "The past four years in J-pop have been dire on the ballad front, but Ayu manages to come through here with “Sweet Scar“, exhibiting the only moment of the album where she changes gears from her quotidian norm when it comes to ballads." He concluded on the song by stating "Ayu can deliver a nice ballad without musical theatrics, and that her voice is at its most emotive when she isn’t screeching like some demon ho of the underworld." For "Wake Me Up", he highlighted it as an album stand out track, saying that it was a "banger". CDJournal.com reviewed each song individually. For "Wake Me Up" and "Sweet Scar", they praised Hamasaki's vocals for being "powerful" and "strong". For "Snowy Kiss", they praised Hamasaki's songwriting and commended the production, while they commended Hamasaki's subtle vocals on "Ivy".

Charting as a single, Again reached number seven on the Japanese Oricon Singles Chart and lasted ten weeks in the chart. Again sold over 53,000 units in Japan, her lowest charting and selling EP to date and her first EP not to achieve a certification by the Recording Industry Association of Japan (RIAJ).

Track listing

Credits and personnel 

Song credits
 Ayumi Hamasaki – vocals, background vocals, songwriting 
 Max Matsuura – producer
 Hiten Bharadia – composer
 Philippe-Marc Anquetil – composer
 Bárður Háberg – composer
 Dai Nagao – composer
 Tetsuya Komuro – composer
 Kazuhiro Hara – composer
 Yasuhiko Hoshino – composer
 Tasuku – arranger
 Yuta Nakano – arranger
 Shingo Kobayashi – arranger
 Remo-con – arranger, remixer
 Shohei Matsumoto – arranger, remixer

Visual and video credits
 Masashi Muto – director
 Wataru Takeishi – director
 Takuma Noriage – art direction, creative direction
 Ryan Chan – photographer
 Takuma Noriage – design

Credits adapted from the EP's liner notes.

Charts and certifications

Charts

Certifications and sales

Notes

References

Ayumi Hamasaki EPs
2012 EPs
Avex Group EPs
Japanese-language EPs